David Edguard or Edwardes (fl. 1529 - 1532) was an English anatomist.

Life
Edwardes was educated first at Oxford and afterwards at Cambridge. He took an M.D. at Cambridge in 1529.

Works
He published two short works:

 'De Indiciis et Præcognitionibus,’ London 1532, dedicated to Henry Fitzroy, Duke of Richmond, by 'medicus suus.'
 'Introductio ad Anatomicen' (same place and date), dedicated to Henry Howard, Earl of Surrey. In the preface to this pamphlet Edguard promised a complete manual of anatomy, illustrated by the opinions of all the most learned men, but apparently he did not live to carry out his intention. Both works are dated from Cambridge 12 January 1532.

References

Attribution

English anatomists
Alumni of the University of Cambridge
Alumni of the University of Oxford
16th-century English writers
16th-century male writers
English medical writers
Year of birth missing
Year of death missing